The Black Riders and Other Lines is a book of poetry written by American author Stephen Crane (1871–1900). It was first published in 1895 by Copeland & Day.

Composition and publication history
In the winter of 1893, Crane borrowed a suit from John Northern Hilliard and visited the critic and editor William Dean Howells, who introduced Crane to the poetry of Emily Dickinson. Crane was inspired by her writing and, within several months, wrote the beginnings of what became his first book of poetry. One friend recalled that he saw Crane's first attempts at poetry in mid-February 1894 and Hamlin Garland claimed in a later reminiscence that Crane brought him a pile of manuscripts the next month. Crane told friends that the poems came to him spontaneously and as pictures, saying, "They came, and I wrote them, that's all."

The Black Riders and Other Lines was published in May 1895 by Copeland & Day and marked Crane's first serious venture into poetry. It was Crane's second published volume, following Maggie: A Girl of the Streets (1893) and predating The Red Badge of Courage (1895). Its first printing was a limited run of 500 copies, with a few issued in vellum. The collection contained sixty-eight short poems written in Crane's sparse, unconventional style. The untitled "lines", as Crane referred to them, were differentiated by Roman numerals and written entirely in small capitals. Crane was 23 years old when the book was published.

Response
Many of the poems in The Black Riders and Other Lines depict a vengeful God inspired by the Old Testament interacting with disrespectful humans. Critics were especially focused on the book's apparent anti-religious themes. Harriet Monroe wrote that the book "is full of wisdom of yesteryear... as old-fashioned as Bob Ingersoll's fiery denunciations. Crane's startling utterances... somehow cease to startle after twenty years." Amy Lowell, however, found these themes reflective of Crane's own struggle with belief: "He disbelieved it and he hated it, but he could not free himself from it... Crane's soul was heaped with bitterness and this bitterness he flung back at the theory of life which had betrayed him". Elbert Hubbard, who had encouraged Crane's unusual poetry, was impressed by their unconventional structure: "The 'Lines' in The Black Riders seem to me wonderful: charged with meaning like a storage battery. But there is a fine defy in the flavour that warns the reader not to take too much or it may strike in. Who wants a meal of horseradish?"

Crane himself thought The Black Riders a superior work to his more famous novel The Red Badge of Courage. As he wrote, "the former is the more ambitious effort. In it, I am to give my ideas of life as a whole, so far as I know it, and the latter is a mere episode,—an amplification".

Poetry

 Black riders came from the sea.
 Three little birds in a row
 In the Desert
 Yes, I have a thousand tongues
 Once there came a man
 God fashioned the ship of the world carefully
 Mystic shadow, bending near me,
 I looked here
 I stood upon a high place,
 Should the wide world roll away,
 In a lonely place,
 "And the sins of the fathers shall be"
 If there is a witness to my little life,
 There was a crimson clash of war.
 "Tell brave deeds of war."
 There were many who went in huddled procession
 In heaven
 A god in wrath
 A learned man came to me once
 There was, before me
 Once I saw mountains angry
 Places among the stars
 I saw a man pursuing the horizon
 Behold, the grave of a wicked man
 There was set before me a mighty hill
 A youth in apparel that glittered
 "Truth," said a traveller
 Behold, from the land of the farther suns
 Supposing that I should have the courage
 Many workmen
 Two or three angels
 There was one I met upon the road
 I stood upon a highway
 A man saw a ball of gold in the sky
 I met a seer
 On the horizon the peaks assembled
 The ocean said to me once
 The livid lightnings flashed in the clouds
 And you love me
 Love walked alone
 I walked in a desert
 There came whisperings in the winds
 I was in the darkness
 Tradition, thou art for suckling children
 Many red devils ran from my heart
 "Think as I think," said a man
 Once there was a man
 I stood musing in a black world
 You say you are holy
 A man went before a strange God
 Why do you strive for greatness, fool?
 Blustering God
 "It was wrong to do this," said the angel
 A man toiled on a burning road
 A man feared that he might find an assassin
 With eye and with gesture
 The sage lectured brilliantly
 Walking in the sky
 Upon the road of my life
 There was a man and a woman
 There was a man who lived a life of fire
 There was a great cathedral
 Friend, your white beard sweeps the ground
 Once, I knew a fine song
 If I should cast off this tattered coat
 God lay dead in heaven
 A spirit sped

See also 
 Stephen Crane bibliography

References

External links

 
 Full text at Project Gutenberg

1895 poetry books
Works by Stephen Crane
American poetry collections